The Spain women's national volleyball team represents Spain in international women's volleyball competitions and friendly matches.

Results

Summer Olympics
 Champions   Runners up   Third place   Fourth place

World Championship
 Champions   Runners up   Third place   Fourth place

World Cup
 Champions   Runners up   Third place   Fourth place

European Championship
 Champions   Runners up   Third place   Fourth place

European Volleyball League
 Champions   Runners up   Third place   Fourth place

Mediterranean Games
 Champions   Runners up   Third place   Fourth place

External links
Official website
FIVB profile

Volleyball
National women's volleyball teams
Volleyball in Spain